2023 in professional wrestling describes the current year's events in the world of professional wrestling.

List of notable promotions 
These promotions are holding notable shows throughout 2023.

Calendar of notable shows

January

February

March

April

May

June

July

August

September

October

November

December

Notable events
 January 6 – Vince McMahon returns to WWE as a board member after previously retiring in 2022.
 January 10 – Stephanie McMahon resigns as co-CEO and chairwoman of WWE. Vince McMahon takes the title of chairman, while Nick Khan becomes the sole CEO of the company.
 January 20 – Major League Wrestling signs a new broadcast deal with Reelz.
 January 21 – Negro Casas and his wife Dalys la Caribeña depart from Consejo Mundial de Lucha Libre (CMLL), making their surprise debuts for Lucha Libre AAA Worldwide on the same day. This marked the end of Casas' over 40-year tenure with CMLL.

Accomplishments and tournaments

AAA

AEW

BJW

CF

DDT

Noah

TJPW

Ganbare

CMLL

The Crash

DG

GCW

Gleat

IWRG

M-Pro

NJPW

NWA

PWG

ROH

Stardom

WWE

Title changes

2AW

AAA

AEW

AJPW

BJW

CF
 – DDT Pro-Wrestling
 – Pro Wrestling Noah
 – Tokyo Joshi Pro-Wrestling
 – Ganbare Pro-Wrestling

DDT

Noah

TJPW

GanPro

CMLL

The Crash

DG

GCW

Gleat

Impact

IWRG

MLW

M-Pro

NWA

NJPW

Stardom

PWG

Zero1

Zero1 Japan

Zero1 USA

Super Fireworks Pro

ROH

XPW

WWE
 – Raw
 – SmackDown
 – NXT
 – Unbranded

Raw and SmackDown
Raw and SmackDown each have a world championship, a secondary championship, a women's championship, and a male tag team championship.

NXT

Unbranded
These titles are not brand exclusive. The colors indicate the home brand of the champions (names without a color are former WWE wrestlers, Hall of Famers, or non-wrestlers).

Awards and honors

GCW

Indie Wrestling Hall of Fame

Women's Wrestling Hall of Fame

WWE

WWE Hall of Fame

Debuts
March 3 – Azusa Inaba

Retirements
 January 14 – Jinny (2015–2023)
 February 7 – Booker T (1986–2023)
 February 21 –
 Keiji Mutoh (1984–2023)
 Nosawa Rongai (1995–2023)
 March 9 – Daisuke Harada (2006–2023)

Deaths

 January 10 – Black Warrior (born 1969)
 January 17 –
 Jay Briscoe (born 1984)
 Rickin Sánchez (born 1935)
 February 2 –
 Lanny Poffo (born 1954)
 Kenny Jay (born 1937)
 February 6 – Charlie Norris (born 1965)
 February 11 – Erich Froelich (born 1937)
 February 12 – Billy Two Rivers (born 1935)
 February 14 – Jerry Jarrett (born 1942)
 March 15 – Jeff Gaylord (born 1958)
 March 17 – Sean Patrick O'Brien (born 1988)

See also 
 List of WWE pay-per-view and WWE Network events, WWE Raw special episodes, WWE SmackDown special episodes, and WWE NXT special episodes 
 List of AEW pay-per-view events, special events, and AEW Dynamite special episodes
 List of Impact Wrestling pay-per-view events and Impact Plus Monthly Specials
 List of NJPW major events and NJPW Strong special episodes
 List of World Wonder Ring Stardom major events
 List of major Pro Wrestling Noah events
 List of major DDT Pro-Wrestling events
 List of ROH pay-per-view events
 List of MLW events
 List of NWA pay-per-view events

References 

 
professional wrestling